Sergio Santander Benavente (5 March 1954 – 26 September 1987) was a Chilean racecar driver. He was the Chilean Formula 3 Champion in 1981. 

Santander was killed on 26 September 1987 at the age of 33 in a crash in the Chilean F3 race at the Autódromo Las Vizcachas in Santiago.

References

1954 births
1987 deaths
Chilean racing drivers
Racing drivers who died while racing
Filmed deaths in motorsport
Sport deaths in Chile